The women's marathon T54 was a marathon event in athletics at the 2008 Summer Paralympics in Beijing, for wheelchair athletes. It was the only marathon event held for women (whereas there were four marathons held for men, in various categories). Wheelchair athletes with a disability level more severe than T54 (i.e., T53) were permitted to compete in the T54 marathon. Ten athletes, from seven countries, took part; defending champion Kazu Hatanaka of Japan was not among them.

The result was extremely close. Edith Hunkeler of Switzerland won the gold medal, setting a new Paralympic record in 1:39:59, just one second ahead of the United States' Amanda McGrory, and two seconds ahead of compatriot Sandra Graf. The top eight athletes finished within a minute of one another, and the top five within five seconds.

Results

See also
 Marathon at the Paralympics

References 
 New York Times article, with a picture of Edith Hunkeler crossing the finish line

Women's marathon T54
Summer Paralympics
Marathons at the Paralympics
2008 Summer Paralympics
Summer Paralympics marathon T54